Dolichopus tenuipes is a species of long-legged fly in the family Dolichopodidae.

References

tenuipes
Articles created by Qbugbot
Insects described in 1894
Taxa named by John Merton Aldrich